''Here is list of mountains (hills) in Estonia

References

 
Estonia
Mountains
Estonia